Home for the Holidays is the fifty-second album by American singer/guitarist Glen Campbell, released in 1993 (see 1993 in music).

Track listing

 "The Christmas Song" (Mel Tormé, Robert Wells)
 "Away in a Manger medley" (J. R. Murray, Bishop Phillips Brooks, Traditional)
 "Away in a Manger"
 "O Little Town of Bethlehem"
 "The First Noel"
 "It Came Upon a Midnight Clear" (Edmund H. Sears, Richard S Willis)
 "Little Drummer Boy" (K. K. Davis, Henry Onorati, Harry Simeone)
 "What Child Is This?" (William Dix)
 "I'll Be Home for Christmas" (Kim Gannon, Walter Kent, Buck Ram)
 "Hark The Herald Angels Sing medley" (Rev. F. Oakeley, John H. Hopkins, Rev. C. Wesley)
 "O Come, O Come Emmanuel"
 "We Three Kings"
 "Hark the Herald Angels Sing"
 "Silent Night" (Joseph Mohr, Franz Gruber)
 "Have Yourself A Merry Little Christmas" (Ralph Blane, Hugh Martin)
 "O Holy Night" (Adolphe Adams, John S. Dwight)

Personnel
Glen Campbell – vocals
Shane Keister – keyboards, synthesizer
Dann Huff – electric guitar
Owen Hale – drums
David Hungate – bass guitar
John Willis – acoustic guitar
Farrell Morris – percussion
Cynthia Wyatt – harp
Jim Horn – flute
Bobby Taylor – oboe
Tom McAninch – French horn
Richard Steffen – trumpet
Don Sheffield – trumpet
Dan Oxley – trumpet
Dennis Good – trombone
Ernie Collins – bass trombone
Toby Parrish – bagpipes
Guest vocalist on "Away in a Manger medley" – Vince Gill
Background vocals – Lura Foster, Jana King, Lisa Silver, Jon Ivey
Choir – Sherry Huffman, Lisa Glasgow, Ellen Musick, Mark Ivy, Chris Willis
Strings – Nashville String Machine

Production
Producer – Glen Campbell, Ken Harding, Bergen White
Arranger – Bergen White
Engineer – Warren Peterson
Assistant engineers – Larry Jefferies, Robert Charles
Production assistants- Debbie Harding, Brian Bush
Photography – Sandra Gillard / Lightkeepers
Recorded and mixed at Javelina Recording Studio, Nashville, TN
Mastered by Hank Williams at Master Mix, Nashville, TN

References

Glen Campbell albums
1993 Christmas albums
Christmas albums by American artists
Country Christmas albums